Kirti was a Punjabi monthly started by the veteran Ghadarite Santokh Singh in February 1926. It was purely a communist production, subsidized by the Ghadar Party in the United States. Within a few months, Sohan Singh Josh took over as the editor. In 1928, the Communist Party of India tied-Kirti group (also known as the Kirti Kisan Party) was formed, Kirti became its mouthpiece. Its purpose was to outline the basic ideas of revolution and Marxist ideals.

According to Santokh Singh, the word Kirti is the exact translation of the word "labourer", a person who does not have any capital and means of production and earns his living by working for others. Similarly Kirti Shreni is the class of people who do not have any capital or means of production.

Bhagat Singh was appointed to the editorial board of Kirti and worked as a deputy editor where he wrote several articles on revolution, communism, and dictatorship of the proletariat. He also used Kirti, the newspaper of the Kirti Kisan Party, to promulgate the Naujawan Bharat Sabha's message.

References

Communist magazines
Punjabi-language newspapers
Magazines established in 1926
Monthly magazines published in the United States
Political magazines published in the United States